Dangke is a type of cheese produced in South Sulawesi, Indonesia, especially in Enrekang, Baraka, Anggeraja, and Alla districts. Dangke is processed by boiling fresh buffalo milk with sliced papaya leaves, stems, or unripe papaya fruits. Dangke is typically soaked in a brine solution overnight before being wrapped with banana leaves for masking the bitter taste caused by the addition of papaya leaves.

Dangke is made by heating pure milk until it boils, caution must be exercised during the boiling process because of the risk of overflow. To get milk fiber (dangke), when the milk is boiling, add a little papaya sap in the approximate ratio of two drops per liter of milk. Do not overdo it because it can make it bitter and the lumps of milk fiber cannot thicken. Papaya sap is useful for separating milk fiber (protein) from water. The milk fiber which is already in the form of lumps is then filtered, drained of water, and then put in a mold made of coconut shell slices. To get a taste, you can add salt when you boil it.

Dangke can be served directly as a high-protein side dish or processed into other food variations such as grilled dangke, stir-fried dangke, dangke crackers and others.

Dangke is similar to Dadiah in West Sumatra, but whereas Dangke is made by heating milk with papaya thus producing a solid when cooled, Dadiah is made by fermenting milk and has a soft texture.

See also

List of cheeses
List of water buffalo cheeses
List of dairy products
List of Indonesian dishes
Other Indonesian cheeses:
Dali ni horbo
Edam
Gouda
Litsusu cologanti

References

 
Indonesian cuisine